Leopold Karl Schmetterer  (8 November 1919 in Vienna – 23 August 2004 in Gols) was an Austrian mathematician working on analysis, probability,  and statistics.

Decorations and awards
 1973: Fellow of the American Statistical Association
 1975: Austrian Cross of Honour for Science and Art, 1st class
 1976: Science Award of the City of Vienna
 1981: Austrian State Prize for Science Policy (Ludwig Boltzmann Prize)
 1984: Erwin Schrödinger Prize of the Austrian Academy of Sciences

References

 Friedrich Pukelsheim: Leopold Schmetterer 8.11.1919–24.8.2004, Jahrbuch der Bayerischen Akademie der Wissenschaften 2004, 317–320.

Mathematicians from Vienna
1919 births
2004 deaths
Recipients of the Austrian Cross of Honour for Science and Art, 1st class
Recipients of the Austrian State Prize
Members of the German Academy of Sciences at Berlin
Fellows of the American Statistical Association
Probability Theory and Related Fields editors